The Blue Chip 30, also called the Cape Cod 30, is an American sailboat that was designed by A. Sidney DeWolf Herreshoff as a cruiser and first built in 1961.

Production
The design was built by Cape Cod Shipbuilding in the United States from 1961 until 1985, but it is now out of production.

Design
The Blue Chip 30 is a recreational keelboat, built predominantly of fiberglass, with wood trim. It has a masthead sloop rig; a spooned, raked stem with a bowsprit; a raised counter, angled transom, a keel-mounted rudder controlled by a tiller and a fixed long keel. It displaces  and carries  of lead ballast.

The design has sleeping accommodation for four people, with a double "V"-berth in the bow cabin and a two straight settee berths in the main cabin. The galley is located on the starboard side just aft of the bow cabin. The galley is equipped with a two-burner stove, an ice box and a sink. The head is located just aft of the bow cabin on the port side.

See also
List of sailing boat types

References

Keelboats
1960s sailboat type designs
Sailing yachts
Sailboat type designs by A. Sidney DeWolf Herreshoff
Sailboat types built by Cape Cod Shipbuilding